The Moscow Ladies Open is a defunct WTA Tour affiliated tennis tournament played from 1989 to 1995. It was held in Moscow, Soviet Union, from 1989 to 1990 (under the titles of Virginia Slims of Moscow and Kraft General Foods of Moscow, respectively) and in St. Petersburg, Soviet Union, in 1991 (as St. Petersburg Open) and again in Moscow from 1994 to 1995. Then the tournament was incorporated into the ATP Kremlin Cup, making it a combined event for 1996. The tournament was played on indoor carpet courts.

In 2018 tournament returned in WTA calendar as clay court championship Moscow River Cup.

Finals

Singles

Doubles

References
 WTA Results Archive
 

 
Carpet court tennis tournaments
Indoor tennis tournaments
Tennis tournaments in Russia
WTA Tour
Recurring sporting events established in 1989
Recurring sporting events disestablished in 1995
Defunct tennis tournaments in Europe
Sports competitions in Moscow
Defunct sports competitions in Russia
1989 establishments in the Soviet Union
1995 disestablishments in Russia